Tlepolemus was regent of Egypt in the Ptolemaic period under the reign of the boy-king Ptolemy V. He was briefly prominent at the end of the 3rd century BC; his dates of birth and death are not known.

Tlepolemus was a member of a distinguished Persian family who had migrated to Egypt in the late 3rd century BC. He was strategos (military governor) of the region of Pelusium in 202 BC when the regent Agathocles and his family were overthrown and killed in a popular uprising. Tlepolemus took Agathocles' place as regent, but held it only until the following year, 201 BC, when he was in his turn replaced by Aristomenes of Alyzia.

Notes

Sources

Primary sources
Polybius, xv.25, 34

Secondary works
Edwyn Bevan, The House of Ptolemy, Chapter 7, passim
Walter Ameling, "Tlepolemos [4]" in Der neue Pauly vol. 12 part 1 p. 636 f.

3rd-century BC births
2nd-century BC deaths
2nd-century BC Iranian people
3rd-century BC Iranian people
Ptolemaic governors
Ptolemaic regents